José Adolfo Ricardo Matte Pérez (born 1860–1913) was a Chilean politician and lawyer who served as President of the Senate of Chile.

External links
 BCN Profile

1860 births
1913 deaths
Chilean people
Chilean politicians
Conservative Party (Chile) politicians
University of Chile alumni
Presidents of the Senate of Chile
20th-century Chilean politicians
Mayors of Providencia